The Ballahoo class (also known as the Fish class) was a Royal Navy class of eighteen 4-gun schooners built under contract in Bermuda during the Napoleonic War. The class was an attempt by the Admiralty to harness the expertise of Bermudian shipbuilders who were renowned for their fast-sailing craft (particularly the Bermuda sloops). The Admiralty ordered twelve vessels on 23 June 1804, and a further six on 11 December 1805.

Construction
A number of different builders in different yards built them, with all the first batch launching in 1804 and 1805. The second batch were all launched in 1807. Goodrich & Co acted as the main contractor to the Navy Board, and in many cases the actual builder is unrecorded. They were all constructed of Bermuda cedar.

This durable, native wood, abundant in Bermuda, was strong and light, and did not need seasoning.  Shipbuilders used it for framing as well as planking, which reduced vessel weight. It was also highly resistant to rot and marine borers, giving Bermudian vessels a potential lifespan of twenty years and more, even in the worm-infested waters of the Chesapeake and the Caribbean.

Operational lives
Of the eighteen vessels in the class, only two were not lost or disposed of during the war, surviving to be sold in 1815-6. Twelve were wartime losses, and four were disposed of before 1815.

William James wrote scathingly of the Ballahoo and subsequent Cuckoo-class schooners, pointing out the high rate of loss, primarily to wrecks or foundering, but also to enemy action. He reports that they were "sent to 'take, burn, and destroy' the vessels of war and merchantmen of the enemy". The record suggests that none seem to have done so successfully. In the only two (arguably three) cases when the Cuckoo-class schooners did engage enemy vessels, in each case the enemy force was much stronger and overwhelmed the Cuckoo-class schooners.

James also remarks that:

Ships

Orders of 23 June 1803

The first twelve were intended for three different stations:
Newfoundland: Herring, Mackerel, Pilchard, and Capelin
Jamaica:- Barracuta, Whiting, Pike, and Haddock
Leeward Islands: Flying Fish, Ballahou, Grouper, and Snapper.

Orders of 11 December 1805

Citations

References
 
 
 
 

 
+
Ships built in Bermuda
Ship classes of the Royal Navy
Schooner classes